Tim Fywell is an English television and film director. In 2003 he made his first feature debut with I Capture the Castle, an adaptation of the novel of the same title by Dodie Smith. Fywell directed his first Hollywood feature, Ice Princess starring Michelle Trachtenberg, in 2005. Fywell started his career in British television, directing episodes of Brookside.

Selected filmography
Brookside (TV Series, unknown episodes)
Bergerac (TV Series, one episode: "All the Sad Songs", 1990)
Gallowglass (TV, 1993)
Cracker (TV series, episodes: 1994–95; serials: "To Be A Somebody" and "True Romance")
Norma Jean & Marilyn (TV, 1996)
The Woman in White (TV, 1997)
Madame Bovary (TV, 2000)
I Capture the Castle (2003)
Cambridge Spies (TV, 2003)
 Hear the Silence (TV, 2003)
Ice Princess (2005)
Half Broken Things (TV, 2007)
Waking the Dead (TV, 8 episodes, 2007–2011)
Affinity (TV, 2008)
The No. 1 Ladies' Detective Agency (TV, 2009)
The Turn of the Screw (TV, 2009)
Happy Valley (TV, 2 episodes, 2014)
The English Game (TV, 2020)

References

External links

1951 births
Living people
People educated at St Paul's School, London
English film directors
English television directors